Peter Reitmayer (born 6 July 1993) is a Slovak former competitive figure skater. A two-time senior national champion, he represented Slovakia at the 2009 World Junior Championships, 2010 European Championships, and 2010 World Championships. He also competed at the 2009 Nebelhorn Trophy, the final qualifying opportunity for the 2010 Winter Olympics. His placement, 21st, was not high enough to earn a spot at the Olympics.

Reitmayer is the son of Iveta Reitmayerová, a figure skating coach, and Peter Reitmayer, an alpine skier; the grandson of an ice hockey player, Jindrich; and the brother of Ivana Reitmayerová, a former figure skater. 

Peter is currently a figure skater performing in shows on cruise ships.

Programs

Competitive highlights

References

External links 
 

1993 births
Slovak male single skaters
Living people
Sportspeople from Košice